The Melbourne Holocaust Museum (MHM) (formerly known as the Jewish Holocaust Centre) was founded in Elsternwick, Melbourne, Australia, in 1984 by Holocaust survivors. It is currently Australia’s largest institution dedicated to Holocaust education, research & remembrance. Its mission is to commemorate the six million Jews murdered by the Nazis between 1933 and 1945.

The museum was founded without significant public or private funds and thus has always had to rely on support from Holocaust survivors, their relatives, volunteers and philanthropists. It is thanks to the unique contribution of Melbourne's Holocaust survivors that the JHC has become a vibrant institution. The museum contains a specialist Holocaust library, a collection of over 1300 survivor video testimonials as well as thousands of original documents, photos, artworks and objects from the Holocaust period.

Miriam Fink was a member of the centre's original organising committee and together with her husband Leo, she established the Leo and Mina Fink Fund, which enabled the purchase of the Centre's building.

In 2019, the museum began a major redevelopment project with Kerstin Thompson Architects and McCorkell Constructions, due to reopen in late 2022. In 2022, ahead of their anticipated reopening, they also updated their name to the Melbourne Holocaust Museum with a fresh logo.

The purpose of the MHM is to fight racism and to encourage harmony within the community. It attempts to reach these goals by providing information about the Holocaust through its permanent exhibition and periodic temporary exhibitions. The main focus lies on the younger generation, and over 21,000 students visit the museum every year and participate in a powerful education program. In 2011 the museum was the recipient of the MAGNA Best Small Museum award by Museums Australia, following a redesign of the permanent exhibition.

Apart from guided tours through the museum, which are often led by Holocaust survivors, the MHM offers adult education programs, teacher training and also hosts lectures which are open to the public. Furthermore, the MHM provides assistance for Holocaust Survivors in cooperation with JewishCare, a Jewish welfare organization.

Since 2008 Austrian volunteers from the Austrian Holocaust Memorial Service are able to work for 10–12 months in the MHM alternatively to compulsory military service or civilian service in Austria. Their work includes, among other things, the translation of documents, the preparation of exhibitions, working in the library and cataloguing of photographs.

See also 
 Jewish Museum of Australia
 Sydney Jewish Museum
 Australian Association for Jewish Studies

Sources/ External links 
 Jewish Holocaust Centre
 Austrian Holocaust Memorial Service
 Austrian Service Abroad

References

Holocaust museums
Jews and Judaism in Melbourne
Museums in Melbourne
1984 establishments in Australia